The 2013 New Zealand Open Grand Prix was the fourth grand prix gold and grand prix tournament of the 2013 BWF Grand Prix Gold and Grand Prix. The tournament was held in North Shore Events Centre, Auckland, New Zealand April 10 until April 14, 2013 and had a total purse of $50,000.

Men's singles

Seeds

  Simon Santoso (quarter-final)
  Hsu Jen-hao (semi-final)
  Ajay Jayaram (quarter-final)
  Rajah Menuri Venkata Gurusaidutt (second round)
  Anand Pawar (second round)
  Andre Kurniawan Tedjono (third round)
  Wisnu Yuli Prasetyo (third round)
  Zulfadli Zulkiffli (withdrew)
  Petr Koukal (withdrew)
  Riyanto Subagja (second round)
  Riichi Takeshita (champion)
  Hong Ji-hoon (third round)
  Arvind Bhat (quarter-final)
  Chetan Anand (second round)
  Qiao Bin (first round)
  Park Sung-min (third round)

Finals

Top half

Section 1

Section 2

Section 3

Section 4

Bottom half

Section 5

Section 6

Section 7

Section 8

Women's singles

Seeds

  Pai Hsiao-ma (quarter-final)
  Kaori Imabeppu (second round)
  Deng Xuan (champion)
  Yeni Asmarani (second round)
  Maziyyah Nadhir (first round)
  Yao Xue (semi-final)
  Renna Suwarno (second round)
  Milicent Wiranto (second round)

Finals

Top half

Section 1

Section 2

Bottom half

Section 3

Section 4

Men's doubles

Seeds

  Angga Pratama / Ryan Agung Saputra (champion)
  Goh V Shem / Lim Khim Wah (second round)
  Mohd Zakry Abdul Latif / Mohd Fairuzizuan Mohd Tazari (second round)
  Gan Teik Chai / Ong Soon Hock (first round)
  Ricky Karanda Suwardi / Muhammad Ulinnuha (second round)
  Chen Hung-ling / Lu Chia-bin (quarter-final)
  Kim Dae-eun / Shin Baek-cheol (second round)
  Chooi Kah Ming / Ow Yao Han (quarter-final)

Finals

Top half

Section 1

Section 2

Bottom half

Section 3

Section 4

Women's doubles

Seeds

  Vivian Hoo Kah Mun / Woon Khe Wei (final)
  Komala Dewi / Jenna Gozali (quarter-final)
  Chow Mei Kuan / Lee Meng Yean (first round)
  Koharu Yonemoto / Yuriko Miki (second round)

Finals

Top half

Section 1

Section 2

Bottom half

Section 3

Section 4

Mixed doubles

Seeds

  Riky Widianto / Richi Puspita Dili (final)
  Irfan Fadhilah / Weni Anggraini (quarter-final)
  Tan Aik Quan / Lai Pei Jing (quarter-final)
  Shin Baek-cheol / Jang Ye-na (quarter-final)
  Praveen Jordan / Vita Marissa (champion)
  Kim Dae-eun / Kim So-young (semi-final)
  Chen Hung-ling / Wu Ti-jung (semi-final)
  Lin Yen-jui / Pai Hsiao-ma (first round)

Finals

Top half

Section 1

Section 2

Bottom half

Section 3

Section 4

References

New Zealand Open (badminton)
New Zealand
New Zealand Open Grand Prix
New Zealand Open Grand Prix
April 2013 sports events in New Zealand
Sport in Auckland